Levodopa/benserazide, sold under the brand name Prolopa among others, is a fixed-dose combination medication used for the treatment of Parkinson's disease.

Medical uses 
Levodopa/benserazide is indicated for the treatment of Parkinson's disease with the exception of drug-induced parkinsonism.

References

External links 

Antiparkinsonian agents
Aromatic L-amino acid decarboxylase inhibitors
Hydrazides
Peripherally selective drugs
Pyrogallols